Enga Muthalali is a 1993 Indian Tamil-language drama film directed by Liaquat Ali Khan. The film stars Vijayakanth and Kasthuri. It was released on 13 November 1993.

Plot 

Vijaya Ragunadhan (Vijayakanth), a kind-hearted landlord and the village grams, lives with his younger brother Balu (Raja) and his mother (Janaki). He conflicts with his uncle (R. Sundarrajan) since he sent his cousin Jayaraman (Napoleon) to jail for killing a poor farmer. Vijaya Ragunadhan and his niece Kalyani (Kasthuri) are in love since their childhood.

Vijaya Ragunadhan's uncle encourages Sitharaman, Vijaya Ragunadhan's brother-in-law, to stand for their village association's election. Sitharaman and Vijaya Ragunadhan clash during the election, Sitharaman decides to arrange the marriage between his daughter Kalyani and 'Bambaram' Pandu (Vivek). At the wedding, Vijaya Ragunadhan beats Sitharaman's henchmen and gets eventually married to Kalyani.

Balu and Kaveri, Kalyani's half-sister, fall in love with each other. Later, Balu clashes with his brother Vijaya Ragunadhan.

Cast 

Vijayakanth as Vijayaragunathan Reddy
Kasthuri as Kalyani
Radha Ravi as Seetharaman Reddy
Raja as Balu (Balakrishnan Reddy)
R. Sundarrajan as Narayanan Reddy (Enemy role)
Napoleon as Jayaraman Reddy (Narayanan Reddy Son, Enemy role)
Vennira Aadai Moorthy as Godhandaraman Reddy (Pandurangan Father)
Vivek as Pandurangan ('Bambaram' Pandu)
Thiyagu as Nanjappan
Junior Balaiah
Nalinikanth
Sumithra as Parvathi
Vichithra as Kaveri
Dubbing Janaki as Vijaya Ragunathan Reddy's mother
Thalapathi Dinesh
C. R. Saraswathi as Vani Nayar (Seetharaman Reddy Kife, Kaveri Mother)
John Amirtharaj as Krishna Reddy
Krishnamoorthy
Vellai Subbaiah as Marriage Broker
Karuppu Subbiah as Karuppusamy
Pasi Narayanan

Soundtrack 

The music was composed by Ilaiyaraaja, with lyrics written by Vaali and Panchu Arunachalam.

Reception 
Malini Mannath of The Indian Express wrote, "Liyakat Ali Khan's treatment is fairly neat and he has tackled a subject that is different". Thulasi of Kalki found the film to be cliched and predictable.

References

External links 
 

1990s Tamil-language films
1993 films
Films scored by Ilaiyaraaja
Films with screenplays by Panchu Arunachalam
Indian drama films
1993 drama films